Aesch may refer to:

Aesch, Basel-Landschaft, a municipality in the Swiss canton of Basel-Landschaft
Aesch, Lucerne, a municipality in the Swiss canton of Lucerne
Aesch, Zürich, a municipality in the Swiss canton of Zürich
Aesch bei Neftenbach, a hamlet in the municipality of Neftenbach in the Swiss canton of Zürich